The Courage of Sarah Noble by Alice Dalgliesh is the story of a young girl who travels with her father into Connecticut during the early 18th century, and her experiences with the native Schaghticoke. It was published in 1954 and received a  Newbery Honor Award.

The story 
Sarah accompanies her father in his journey to set up their farm in a newly purchased plot in New Milford. Once they arrive, Sarah and her father begin scouting the land he has bought. They are approached by the people who lived there, the Schaghticoke. Sarah is frightened because of rumors she has heard from children about the "Indians" they would encounter, but finds that the Schaghticoke are friendly to her and her father. They teach them the things they will need to know to survive. In the story, Sarah gives the "Indians" new Christian names, and is given credit as the first teacher in New Milford.

History 
Alice Dalgliesh begins the book with an author's note. In the note, she explicitly states that this is a "true story" and makes a reference to "records" of events. There is still much research that needs to be completed to verify the "facts" presented in this book. As it stands, the New Milford Historical Society holds the majority of the resources for this research. Currently, there is research under way to study the sources that have made this book a mainstay in the education system.

Controversy 

The Courage of Sarah Noble was published in 1954. Today there is controversy about the treatment of the Native Americans in this book. Some people feel that because the story is so widely used in school curriculum, the criticisms are ignored. The controversy surrounding the story was also linked to some dissatisfaction about a statue erected for Sarah Noble.

Reception 
The New York Times Book Review said of The Courage of Sarah Noble "This story is one to be long remembered for its beautiful simplicity and dignity." The American lists it among their best books for 1954 for juveniles to read. Reviewer Anita Silvey appreciates Sarah's character when she calls her "a protagonist strong enough to accompany her father into the wilderness to build a new cabin for their family and to remain there alone when Father goes back for the rest of the family."

Despite this praise, the book has been criticized. The review from Oyate is much more detailed in its analysis of content, citing that "The Courage of Sarah Noble was published in 1954, and it is very much a product of its time—a time that has come and gone."

References 

1954 American novels
American children's novels
Children's historical novels
Novels set in Connecticut
New Milford, Connecticut
Charles Scribner's Sons books
1954 children's books
Schaghticoke tribe